"Backwater" is a song recorded by the Meat Puppets. It was released as the first single from the group's album Too High to Die. The single was released in three versions: one promo CDS and two singles. It is the Meat Puppets most successful single. The highest position in the US was No. 47 in Billboard Hot 100, No. 2 on the Billboard Album Rock Tracks chart, No. 11 on the Billboard Modern Rock Tracks chart and No. 31 on the Billboard Mainstream Top 40 chart. The 3 track single features a cover of the Feederz. They Might Be Giants sing back-up vocals on "White Sport Coat."

Track listing
(All songs by Curt Kirkwood unless otherwise noted)

2 track single track listing
 "Backwater" – 3:39
 "Station" (Cris Kirkwood) – 2:20

3 track promo single track listing
 "Backwater" – 3:39
 "Lake of Fire" (1994 re-recorded version) - 3:13
 "Fuck You" (Feederz cover) – 5:31

5 track single track listing
 "Backwater" – 3:39
 "Open Wide" – 3:13
 "Animal" – 4:33
 "Up on the Sun" (1994 re-recorded version) – 3:49
 "White Sport Coat" (Marty Robbins cover) – 2:12

Chart performance

References

1993 songs
1994 singles
Meat Puppets songs
London Records singles
Music videos directed by Rocky Schenck
Songs written by Curt Kirkwood
They Might Be Giants
Grunge songs